The chapters of the Japanese manga Taboo Tattoo are written and illustrated by Shinjirō. It has been published by Media Factory in its Monthly Comic Alive magazine since November 2009. The plot of the Tattoo Taboo manga series is about a martial arts trained middle schooler named Justice Akatsuka who grains a strange tattoo engraved on his hand after saving a mysterious man. The tattoo is a secret weapon produced in the arms race between America and the Selinistan Kingdom.

Chapters

|}

References

Taboo Tattoo